The First Filat Cabinet was the Cabinet of Moldova between September 25, 2009 and January 14, 2011. It was a caretaker cabinet from the election of November 28, 2010, until it was succeeded by the Second Filat Cabinet on January 14, 2011.

History
The cabinet was formed by the Alliance for European Integration, consisting of the Liberal Democratic Party, the Democratic Party and the Liberal Party who held 53 out of 101 seats in Parliament of Moldova. The government won a vote of confidence on September 25, 2009.

Composition 
The Cabinet consisted of the Prime Minister of Moldova Vlad Filat (leader of the Liberal Democratic Party of Moldova; PLDM), four Deputy Prime Ministers, each representing one of the parties of the coalition, 15 ministers, and two ex officio members.

The Government had 16 Ministries: two Deputy Prime Ministers are also Ministers, while the Minister of State does not lead a Ministry. Two ministries from the previous Cabinet of Zinaida Greceanîi (Reintegration and Local Public Administration) were dissolved.

Cabinet of Ministers 
 Vlad Filat (PLDM), Prime Minister of Moldova  
 Iurie Leancă (PLDM), Deputy Prime Minister, Minister of Foreign Affairs and European Integration 
 Ion Negrei (PL), Deputy Prime Minister for Social Affairs 
 Valeriu Lazăr (PDM), Deputy Prime Minister, Minister of Economy 
 Victor Osipov (AMN), Deputy Prime Minister for Reintegration
 Victor Bodiu (PLDM), Minister of State. Former Director Raiffeisen Moldova.
 Victor Catan (PLDM), Minister of Internal Affairs
 Veaceslav Negruţa (PLDM), Minister of Finance
 Alexandru Tănase (PLDM), Minister of Justice
 Vladimir Hotineanu (PLDM), Minister of Health
 Vitalie Marinuţa (PL), Minister of Defence
 Anatol Şalaru (PL), Minister of Transport and Road Infrastructure
 Gheorghe Şalaru (PL), Minister of Environment
 Ion Cebanu (PL), Minister of Youth and Sports
 Marcel Răducan (PDM), Minister of Public Works and Regional Development
 Valentina Buliga (PDM), Minister of Labour, Social Protection and Family
 Boris Focşa (PDM),  Minister of Culture
 Leonid Bujor (AMN), Minister of Education
 Valeriu Cosarciuc (AMN), Minister of Agriculture and Food Industry 
 Alexandru Oleinic (AMN), Minister of Information Technologies and Communication

Ex officio members 
 Mihail Formuzal, Governor of Gagauzia 
 Gheorghe Duca, Head of the Academy of Sciences of Moldova

Activity 
The first cabinet meeting was held on September 25, 2009 at 22:00.

See also 
 Cabinet of Moldova

External links 
 Government of Moldova

References

 

Moldova cabinets
Alliance for European Integration
Coalition governments
2009 establishments in Moldova
2011 disestablishments in Moldova
Cabinets established in 2009
Cabinets disestablished in 2011